Indigo Records was an American pop record label formed in 1960. Within two years the label issued nearly 50 singles and five LPs.

Origin

Indigo Records was formed in Hollywood, California, in September 1960, by record promoters and producers Don Wayne and Vic Gargano. The year before, the two had entered the record business by partnering to form Inferno Records, which issued only a few releases. Gargano then formed Indigo as a pop label. Artist promoter and manager Jim Lee was brought on as head of A&R.

The Innocents

One of the label's earliest and most successful acts was The Innocents, a vocal trio from the Los Angeles neighborhood of Sun Valley. Starting out as The Echoes, they had been signed by Herb Alpert to Andex Records, where they recorded a couple of tracks. After more rehearsals, the Innocents took their composition "Honest I Do" to Kim Fowley and Gary Paxton at American Studios, who recorded it and sold the master to Indigo. A&R Director Jim Lee signed the group to a record deal and personal management.

In October 1960, "Honest I Do" reached #1 on the record charts in Los Angeles, and #28 nationally. In January 1961, the group's follow-up single, "Gee Whiz," also reached the #28 position on the national charts.

Kathy Young

Indigo A&R Director Jim Lee discovered Kathy Young while managing a personal appearance by the Innocents at the Pacific Ocean Park amusement pier in Santa Monica. He handed her a song written in 1953 by Gene Pearson and recorded by his group, The Rivileers, titled A Thousand Stars.  During the recording session, the Innocents joined Young in what was described as completely impromptu and unplanned harmonizing. "A Thousand Stars," released as performed by "Kathy Young with The Innocents," reached #3 on the Billboard Hot 100 in December 1960, behind Elvis Presley's Are You Lonesome Tonight and Floyd Cramer's Last Date.

Young's follow-up, "Happy Birthday Blues", peaked at No. 30 on the Hot 100 in 1961. Subsequent singles, such as "Magic Is the Night" and "The Great Pretender", failed to chart in the Top 40.

Decline

Despite the successes of the Innocents and Kathy Young, and the release of singles and albums by other artists signed to the label, Indigo overextended itself financially, and shut down in the fall of 1962.

In 1963, Don Wayne took a temporary position as road manager for the Everly Brothers, on a two-week tour of Canada. He stayed with them nine years.

Vic Gargano remained in the record business, forming several successor labels: Magenta, Lavender, Invicta, Condor, and Blue Fin. "In 1974 he trotted Indigo out for one final run, briefly managing and producing Chameleon, a two husband and wife quartet billed as the 'American Abba,'" and had retired by the early 1980s. He died in August 2004.

Seeing the handwriting on the wall, Jim Lee left in the fall of 1961. He founded Monogram Records where, in addition to continuing to produce records for Kathy Young, he discovered and produced records for Chris Montez.

Legacy

Indigo artists' contributions to the pop music scene have endured in the decades since their original release.
 
The Innocents' sessions were compiled by Ace Records in a 25-track CD titled "The Innocents:  The Complete Indigo Recordings," released in 1992.

Kathy Young's recordings were compiled by Crystal Ball Records in a 24-track CD titled "A Thousand Stars," released in 2014.

Select singles 

Source: https://www.discogs.com/label/126251-Indigo-Records-4

Select albums 

The Bob Rogers Orchestra	All That And This Too 	GBM-1501A	1961
Los Camperos	Puro Mariachi	IND-LP-501	1961
Cy Coleman	Selections from 'Wildcat'	GBM-502/GBST-502	1961
The Innocents	Innocently Yours	IND-LP-503	1961
Kathy Young With The Innocents	The Sound Of Kathy Young	IND-LP-504	1961 
Source: http://www.bsnpubs.com/la/indigo/indigo.html

References 

American record labels
Pop record labels
Record labels established in 1960
Record labels disestablished in 1962
Companies based in Los Angeles
Defunct record labels of the United States